Acraea actinotina, the puzzling acraea, is a butterfly in the family Nymphalidae. It is found in central and eastern Nigeria. The describer, Percy Ireland Lathy, mistakenly placed this species in Telipna Lycaenidae - the wrong family. Hence the English name puzzling acraea.

Description

Forewing on both surfaces in the basal part orange-yellow as far as the costal margin and vein 4, in the apical part above black with two elongate yellow subapical spots in 5 and 6, beneath 
black-grey with indistinct light subapical spots in 3-6 and broad black bordering to the yellow basal part. Hindwing brown-grey beneath with some small black basal dots.

Taxonomy
It is a member of the Acraea jodutta  species group-   but see also Pierre & Bernaud, 2014

References

actinotina
Butterflies of Africa
Endemic fauna of Nigeria
Lepidoptera of West Africa
Butterflies described in 1903